Hida Viloria (born May 29, 1968) is a Latine American writer, author, producer, and human rights activist.
Viloria is intersex, nonbinary, and gender nonconforming, using they/them pronouns. They are known for their writing, their intersex and non-binary human rights activism, and as one of the first people to come out in national and international media as a nonbinary intersex person. Viloria is Founding Director of the Intersex Campaign for Equality.

Early life and education

Viloria was born in Jamaica, Queens, New York, to recently immigrated Colombian and Venezuelan parents. Viloria was born with a form of congenital adrenal hyperplasia and a greatly enlarged clitoris as a result. Their father, a physician, and mother, an ex-school teacher, chose to register and raise them as female without subjecting them to genital surgeries, which were generally recommended at the time as corrective procedures for infants with disorders of sexual development. Their father felt that a surgery to reduce the size of their clitoris was medically unnecessary and therefore presented unjustifiable health risks.

Viloria attended Catholic schools in Queens, New York and Wesleyan University in Middletown, Connecticut, from 1986 to 1988. They later transferred to the University of California, Berkeley and graduated in 1998 with an interdisciplinary studies degree in Gender and Sexuality with high honors and high distinction.

Career 

Viloria is author of the acclaimed Born Both: An Intersex Life (Hatchette Book Group, March, 2017), and co-author, with biologic sciences scholar Maria Nieto, Ph.D., of The Spectrum of Sex: The Science of Male, Female, and Intersex (Jessica Kingsley Publishers - Hatchette UK, February, 2020). Their essays on issues such as intersex genital mutilation, discrimination against intersex women in sports, sexuality, legal gender recognition, and gender identity, have been published in venues such as The Washington Post, The Daily Beast, Huffington Post, The Advocate, Ms., The New York Times, The American Journal of Bioethics, the Global Herald, CNN.com, and more.

Viloria is recognized as a leading human rights activist for intersex and was president elect of the Organisation Intersex International from 2011 to 2017. They are the founding director of the Intersex Campaign for Equality (formerly OII-USA) and have worked as a consultant with the United Nations OHCHR, United Nations Free & Equal Campaign, Lambda Legal, Human Rights Watch, Williams Institute, IOC. They've appeared on The Oprah Winfrey Show, 20/20, Gendernauts, One in 2000, Intersexion, and "The General Was Female?".

Viloria used female pronouns earlier in her life and activist career. Later, s/he used the pronouns “s/he” and “he/r” to reflect he/r intersex identity.

Born Both: An Intersex Life 
In January 2017, Kirkus reviewed Viloria's memoir, Born Both, saying: "Intelligent and courageous, [Born Both] chronicles one intersex person's path to wholeness, but it also affirms the right of all intersex and non-binary people to receive dignity and respect". In May 2017, Meghan Daum reviewed Born Both in The New York Times, saying: "Viloria does us the even greater service (it's more of a gift, really) of showing us what it means to live not just as both a man and a woman but also as a third gender that eventually emerges as the right one." Speaking on the LGBTQ&A podcast in December 2021, Viloria said, "The reason I did my memoir is because I felt like there's a story that we don't hear enough of about intersex people, which is that it's amazing and wonderful to be intersex. That's literally my experience." Born Both was nominated for a 2018 Lambda Literary Award for LGBTQ non-fiction.

Opposing nonconsensual medically-unnecessary surgeries

In 1996, Viloria participated in the first international intersex retreat. They reported that, eager to meet people like themself, instead they "met people who'd been traumatized and physically damaged by cosmetic genital surgeries and hormone treatments they'd been subjected to in infancy and childhood, and it moved [Viloria] to become an intersex activist."

Viloria has been advocating publicly against the use of medically unnecessary cosmetic surgeries and hormone therapy on intersex infants and minors, also known as intersex genital mutilation, since 1997, reaching audiences of over one hundred million via appearances in various documentaries about intersex people, including the first Hermaphrodites Speak!, and most notably on ABC's 20/20, The Oprah Winfrey Show, in Spanish on the Emmy nominated Spanish language show Caso Cerrado, and at the UN Headquarters in New York City for Human Rights Day 2013.

In 2004, Viloria testified before the San Francisco Human Rights Commission on the need to ban medically unnecessary cosmetic genital surgeries on intersex infants and children.

Between 2010 and 2017 Viloria published numerous essays speaking out against nonconsensual medically unnecessary surgeries in publications including CNN.com, The Advocate, The Huffingtion Post, and the Narrative Inquiry in Bioethics. Their memoir Born Both: An Intersex Life examines and critiques intersex genital mutilation extensively.

Opposing "disorders of sex development" 

In 2006, the international medical establishment replaced the terms "hermaphrodite" and "intersex" with the term "disorders of sex development". Viloria is among a handful of American intersex activists who opposed the use of the term "Disorders of Sex Development" since its introduction. In 2007, they publicly critiqued the label and the homophobic and transphobic reasoning behind the replacement of 'intersex' with DSD.  They also argued that being raised to define oneself as disordered is psychologically harmful to intersex youth:

Addressing discrimination against intersex women in sports 

In 2009, in response to the treatment of black South African track star Caster Semenya, who was rumored to be intersex, Viloria lobbied as an independent intersex activist for equal rights for intersex female athletes on television and in print on CNN.com. In February 2010, then as Human Rights Spokesperson of the Organisation Intersex International (OII), they authored a petition to the International Olympic Committee demanding that intersex women athletes to be allowed to compete as is, and be de-pathologized. The action resulted in Viloria being invited to participate in the International Olympic Committee's October 2010 meeting of experts on intersex women in sports, in Lausanne, Switzerland, where they lobbied against adopting regulations which require intersex female athletes to undergo medically unnecessary medical procedures in order to compete as women, and against athletes being referred to as individuals with "disorders of sex development".  As a result of Viloria's advocacy, the IOC and IAAF discontinued its use of "disorders of sex development" to describe the athletes in question, and replaced it with "women with hyperandrogenism".

Viloria has argued since 2009 that Olympic sex testing is applied in a way that targets 'butch,' or masculine-looking, women. In 2012, Viloria co-authored an article in the American Journal of Bioethics, with intersex Spanish hurdler Maria José Martínez-Patiño, the athlete responsible for overturning the IOC's long-standing mandatory chromosome testing policies, which critiqued the IOC's proposed regulations for women with high levels of naturally occurring testosterone (aka hyperandrogenism).  Upon the release of the IOC's final regulations for intersex women with hyperandrogenism in 2012, they collaborated on an opinion piece with scholar Georgiann Davis and also told The New York Times that the issues for intersex athletes remain unresolved: "Many athletes have medical differences that give them a competitive edge but are not asked to have medical interventions to 'remove' the advantage.... The real issue is not fairness, but that certain athletes are not accepted as real women because of their appearance."

On Human Rights Day, 2013, Viloria became the first openly intersex person to speak at the U.N., by invitation, at the event "Sport Comes Out Against Homophobia", along with fellow "out" pioneers, tennis legend Martina Navratilova, and NBA player Jason Collins.

In 2014, Viloria advocated against the IOC and IAAF's regulations for women with hyperandrogenism on a panel on the Al Jazeera television show The Stream.  They also wrote about the interphobia and common misunderstandings around naturally occurring testosterone which drive sporting regulations for intersex women, in The Advocate.

Birth registrations 

With the advent of a new German law assigning visibly intersex infants to an 'indeterminate' gender, Viloria has argued that this approach to birth registrations fails to provide adequate human rights for intersex people, and fails to address the most critical need: for an end to normalizing surgical and hormonal interventions on infants and children.

In April 2017, Viloria became the second American recipient of an intersex birth certificate, issued by the city of New York.

National and global affiliations and activism 

In spring 2010, Viloria joined the Organisation Intersex International (OII), the first international intersex organization, was appointed Human Rights Spokesperson, and began lobbying against discriminatory regulations for intersex women athletes. In spring 2011, Viloria was voted Chairperson of OII, upon founder Curtis Hinkle's retirement. Viloria stepped down in November 2017, when Intersex Campaign for Equality left OII.

In the fall of 2011, Viloria founded the Intersex Campaign for Equality, to work for equality and human rights for intersex Americans. Their first action, in December 2011, was contacting former Secretary of State Hillary Clinton to request inclusion of intersex people in human rights protocols and protections. In early 2012, they received a response from the U.S. Department of State in early 2012 affirming the importance of including the intersex community in human rights work.

In 2012, Viloria spearheaded the first unified, global call for human rights by and for intersex people, in a letter signed by thirty leading intersex advocacy organizations, to the Office of the United Nations High Commissioner for Human Rights.

In 2013, Viloria served as one of three intersex co-organizers of the Third International Intersex Forum in November 2013, in Malta, which led to the creation of the Malta declaration, the most widely agreed upon statement of human rights' demands by the international intersex advocacy community.

In 2016, Viloria became a board member of Genital Autonomy America (GA America), an advocacy organization working with groups worldwide who are seeking to end non-therapeutic genital cutting of all female, male, and intersex infants and children.

Media 
Viloria spoke about being non-binary, also known as genderqueer, in the award-winning 1999 documentary Gendernauts.

In 2002, Viloria spoke about feeling blessed they did not experience forced infant genital surgeries on 20/20.

In 2007, on The Oprah Winfrey Show, Viloria likened society's lack of understanding of non-binary people, and the pressure non-binary people experience to identify as men or women, to what people of mixed African-American and Caucasian race sometimes experience, saying, "Society pressures you to choose sides, just like they pressure mixed race people to decide, you know... 'Are you really black? Are you really white?'" Viloria went on to say "I have both [sides]".

In September 2015, the UN's Free & Equal Campaign for Equality produced a video of Viloria in conjunction with the release of their groundbreaking resource the Intersex Fact Sheet, and in 2016 Viloria was one of the "Intersex Voices" featured in the Free and Equal Campaign for Equality's Intersex Awareness Campaign.

Viloria has also advocated against intersex genital mutilation via essays, and in their 2017 memoir, Born Both: An Intersex LIfe.

In 2019 Viloria was featured in the Smithsonian Channel documentary, The General Was Female?, which explores compelling evidence that General Casimir Pulaski, revered as the father of the American Cavalry, may have been intersex.

Selected bibliography

Honors and awards 

In April 2013, Viloria's intersex advocacy organization was selected as a finalist for the Kalamazoo College Global Prize for Collaborative Social Justice, administered by Kalamazoo College's Arcus Center for Social Justice Leadership. Viloria's memoir Born Both: An Intersex Life was selected as one of six books in People magazine's "The Best New Books" list in April 2017, one of School Library Journal's Top Ten Adult Books for Teens, and was a 2018 Lambda Literary Award nominee for LGBTQ non-fiction.

References

External links
Official website
Hida Viloria's Twitter
Born Both: An Intersex Life
Intersex Campaign for Equality

1968 births
Living people
Intersex non-binary people
Intersex rights activists
Intersex rights in the United States
Intersex writers
LGBT Hispanic and Latino American people
Non-binary activists
Genderfluid people
American non-binary writers